Hadrobunus is a genus of harvestman in the family Sclerosomatidae with two species that occur in the United States.

Species
 Hadrobunus grandis (Say, 1821)
 Hadrobunus maculosus (Wood, 1870)

References

Harvestmen
Fauna of North America
Taxa named by Nathan Banks